This song has no relation to the song traditionally sung on people's birthdays.

"Happy Birthday" is a song written, produced and performed by Stevie Wonder for the Motown label. Wonder, a social activist, was one of the main figures in the campaign to have the birthday of Martin Luther King Jr. become a national holiday, and created this single to promulgate the cause. The song has since become a standard for use during birthdays in general, particularly among African-Americans.

"Happy Birthday" was released as the fourth single of Wonder's Hotter than July (1980) album in June 1981. It was one of his most popular entries in the UK Singles Chart. It was not released in the United States, but is still regarded as one of his signature songs.

Background
The song, one of many of Wonder's songs to feature the use of a keyboard synthesizer, features Wonder lamenting the fact that anyone would oppose the idea of a Dr. King holiday, where "peace is celebrated throughout the world" and singing to King in the chorus, "Happy birthday to you". The holiday, he proposes, would facilitate the realization of Dr. King's dreams of integration and "love and unity for all of God's children".

Wonder used the song to popularize the campaign, and continued his fight for the holiday, holding the Rally for Peace Press Conference in 1981. United States President Ronald Reagan approved the creation of the holiday, signing it into existence on November 2, 1983. The first official Martin Luther King Jr. Day, held the third Monday in January of each year, was held on January 20, 1986, and was commemorated with a large-scale concert, where Wonder was the headlining performer.

"Happy Birthday" was released as a single in several countries. In the UK, the song became one of Wonder's biggest hits, reaching number two in the charts in 1981.

When Wonder performed the song at Nelson Mandela Day at Radio City Music Hall on July 19, 2009, he slightly changed the lyrics, "Thanks to Mandela and Martin Luther King!" in the second verse. Wonder also performed this song at the Diamond Jubilee Concert in London for the Diamond Jubilee of Elizabeth II.

Personnel
 Stevie Wondervocals, synthesizer, drums, background vocals, ARP synthesizer, keyboards, bass melodeon

Charts

Certifications

References

1980 songs
1981 singles
Motown singles
Number-one singles in Israel
Protest songs
Song recordings produced by Stevie Wonder
Songs about birthdays
Songs about Martin Luther King Jr.
Songs written by Stevie Wonder
Stevie Wonder songs